Rodwell was a small railway station on the Portland Branch Railway in the west of the English county of Dorset.

Station
Opened on 1 June 1870, it initially had one platform. However, as part of a scheme that saw several halts opened on the GWR with Railmotor services to counter road competition, a passing place was put in and Rodwell gained another platform and a signal box. The station closed with the branch in 3 March 1952.

The site today
The former trackbed of the line is now part of the Rodwell Trail footpath. The former platforms are still in place, just south of the tunnel, under a road and the former Portwey Hospital site.

References

Notes

External links
The Rodwell Trail
Station on navigable O.S. map location marked as Rodwell

Disused railway stations in Dorset
Former Weymouth and Portland Railway stations
Railway stations in Great Britain opened in 1870
Railway stations in Great Britain closed in 1952